Vignole (also Le Vignole) is an island in the Venetian Lagoon, northern Italy, with a surface of some 69.20 ha. It is located north-east of Venice, between the islands of Sant'Erasmo and La Certosa.

Location

Vignole is actually made up of two distinct islands, which are connected by a bridge. 
Like Sant'Erasmo, Vignole houses a scanty population, most of whom work in agriculture. The eastern part of the island is a military zone, housing barracks of the Lagunari regiment. Two bridges connected this sector to the nearby Sant'Andrea Island, home to the eponymous fort.

History
Historically, the island was used by the Romans and the Venetians as a vacation place. At the time, it directly faced the Adriatic Sea, as the Punta Sabbioni had yet to form.

In the 7th century two tribunes from Torcello built a small church dedicated to St. John the Baptist and St. Christine. The few other points of interest include the small church of St. Eurosia, sided by a small bell tower.

Transport
The island is accessed on Actv waterbus line 13 (Fondamente Nove-Murano-Vignole-Lazzaretto Nuovo-Sant'Erasmo-Treporti). It is also served by a night service.

Gallery

References

Islands of the Venetian Lagoon